Phyladelphus is a genus of frit flies in the family Chloropidae. There are at least four described species in Phyladelphus.

Species
These four species belong to the genus Phyladelphus:
 Phyladelphus cristatus Becker, 1911 c g
 Phyladelphus geminus Becker, 1910 c g
 Phyladelphus infuscatus Becker, 1916 c g
 Phyladelphus thalhammeri Becker, 1910 c g
Data sources: i = ITIS, c = Catalogue of Life, g = GBIF, b = Bugguide.net

References

Further reading

External links

 

Chloropidae genera